Mohammadabad-e Geluski (also Romanized as Moḩammadābād-e Gelūskī; also known as Moḩammadābād, Moḩammadābād-e Kalūkī, and Moḩammadābād-e Kelūskī) is a village in Posht Rud Rural District, in the Central District of Narmashir County, Kerman Province, Iran. At the 2006 census, its population was 533, in 122 families.

References 

Populated places in Narmashir County